Trafton is a small unincorporated community located in Snohomish County, Washington. It is located near the city of Arlington, and although many things in the area are named Trafton (such as the historic Trafton School and Trafton Cemetery), most residents consider themselves residents of Arlington.

Etymology 
The community derives its name from Trafalgar, Indiana.

History 
Before colonization, the Stillaguamish had built a large winter village along the river, next to what is now the current site of Trafton. The village was called chuck-kol-che, with only the early transliteration of the native Lushootseed name being known. There were at least 200 people living at the village, with permanent structures including a large longhouse, a smaller house, and a smokehouse. One of the village headmen, or "chiefs," was chad-is.

References

Unincorporated communities in Snohomish County, Washington
Unincorporated communities in Washington (state)